The Oeldorf Building, also known as Wetherell's Jewelers, was a historic commercial building located at Parkersburg in Wood County, West Virginia, United States. It was built in 1906 and was a four-story, two bay, brick building with a stone foundation and trim in the Classical Revival style. It had an intact first floor storefront and sidewalk clock.

It was listed on the National Register of Historic Places in 1982, and it was a contributing property to the Avery Street Historic District, which was designated and listed on the National Register in 1986.

Condemned by the city in 2016, the Oeldorf Building was purchased by the Parkersburg Art Center in 2018 and subsequently demolished on March 23 and 24, 2019.

References

Buildings and structures in Parkersburg, West Virginia
Commercial buildings on the National Register of Historic Places in West Virginia
Neoclassical architecture in West Virginia
Commercial buildings completed in 1906
National Register of Historic Places in Wood County, West Virginia
Individually listed contributing properties to historic districts on the National Register in West Virginia
1906 establishments in West Virginia